is a broadcasting and observation tower in Sumida, Tokyo. It is also the tallest freestanding structure in the OECD, the G20 and G7 countries.

The tower is the primary television and radio broadcast site for the Kantō region; the older Tokyo Tower no longer gives complete digital terrestrial television broadcasting coverage because it is surrounded by high-rise buildings. Skytree was completed on Leap Day, 29 February 2012, with the tower opening to the public on 22 May 2012. The tower is the centrepiece of a large commercial development funded by Tobu Railway (which owns the complex) and a group of six terrestrial broadcasters headed by NHK. Trains stop at the adjacent Tokyo Skytree Station and nearby Oshiage Station. In addition, there is the Sumida Aquarium in the "Tokyo Solamachi" complex.

Design
The tower's design was published on 24 November 2006, based on the following three concepts:
 Fusion of neofuturistic design and the traditional beauty of Japan
 Catalyst for revitalization of the city
 Contribution to disaster prevention – "Safety and Security"

The upper observatory features a spiral, glass-covered skywalk in which visitors ascend the last 5 metres to the highest point at the upper platform. A section of glass flooring gives visitors a direct downward view of the streets below.

Earthquake resistance
The tower has seismic proofing, including a central shaft made of reinforced concrete. From there until 375 metres the pillar is attached to the tower frame with oil dampers, which act as cushions during an earthquake. Additional resilience is achieved through an "added mass control mechanism" (or tuned mass damper) – a damping system which, in the event of an earthquake, moves out of step with the building's structure, to keep the centre of gravity as central as possible to the tower's base. According to the designers, the dampers can absorb 50 percent of the energy from an earthquake.

Colour
The exterior lattice is painted a colour officially called "Skytree White". This is an original colour based on a bluish-white traditional Japanese colour called .

Illumination
The illumination design was published on 16 October 2009. Two illumination patterns alternate daily. One is sky the blue Iki (chic, stylish), and the other is the purple Miyabi (elegance, refinement). The tower is illuminated using LEDs.

Naming and height

From October to November 2007, suggestions were collected from the general public for the name to be given to the tower. The official name was decided in a nationwide vote, and was announced on 10 June 2008 as "Tokyo Skytree". The name received around 33,000 votes (30%) out of 110,000 cast, with the second most popular name being "Tokyo Edo Tower".

The figures 6 (mu), 3 (sa), 4 (shi) stand for "Musashi", an old name of the region where the Tokyo Skytree stands.

Broadcasting use
Tokyo Skytree is used as a radio/television broadcast and communications tower.

Television broadcasters

Radio broadcasters

Timeline

2008
 14 July 2008: A ceremony was held at the site to mark the start of construction.

2009
 6 April 2009: The foundations for the three main legs were completed.
 7 August 2009: The tower reached a height of 100 m.
 16 October 2009: The projected height was increased from 610 m to 634 m to make it the highest self-supporting steel tower. Also, 6-3-4 is Mu-sa-shi in Japanese wordplay goroawase.
 10 November 2009: The tower reached a height of 200 m.

2010
 24 April 2010: A 1:25 scale model of the Tokyo Skytree was unveiled at the Tobu World Square theme park in Nikkō, Tochigi.
 11 September 2010: The tower reached 461 m, becoming the tallest structure ever built in Japan, surpassing the dismantled Tsushima Omega tower of 455 m.
 20 November 2010: Two tuned mass dampers with a total weight of 100 tons were temporarily placed on the tower tip at 497 m.
A lightning conductor and two tuned mass dampers were docked to the gain tower, which was gradually lifted within the central shaft.
 16 December 2010: Ministry of Internal Affairs and Communications approved NHK and five TV key stations in Tokyo's plans to install their broadcasting facilities on the tower.
 18 December 2010: The transmitting antenna for digital terrestrial television began to be installed.

2011
A full inspection was made, looking for possible damage by the 2011 Tōhoku earthquake and its aftershocks.
 23 May 2011: Dismantling four tower cranes continues until mid-July.
 7 June 2011: Announced public opening date of Tokyo Skytree Town and entrance fee (Adults: 2,000 yen to  level; extra 1,000 yen to  level) to observation floors. 
 17 November 2011: Guinness World Records certified the Tokyo Skytree as the tallest free-standing tower.

2012

 16 February 2012: The roofs of warehouses close to the tower were damaged by falling snow and ice from the tower.
 29 February 2012: Tower construction was finished. Completion was delayed two months from the original schedule because of a shortage of supplies due to the effects of the 2011 Japanese earthquake and tsunami.
 2 March 2012: A ceremony was held to celebrate the completion with a kannushi priest and 70 people from Tobu Group, construction, broadcasting and other companies.
 6 March 2012: First Light-up during the Tokyo Hotaru Festival
 26 April 2012: Emperor Akihito and Empress Michiko of Japan inspected the Tokyo Skytree Tembo Galleria.
 22 May 2012: Public opening
 1 October 2012: Channel 9 Tokyo MX start transmission from Tokyo Skytree with continuing transmission from Tokyo Tower in simulcast manner.

2013
 16 January 2013: Snow falling from the tower knocked a hole in the roof of a nearby house. No one was reported injured.
 13 May 2013: Tokyo MX continued transmission from Tokyo Skytree and stopped transmission from Tokyo Tower with a gradual decrease in power since 12 November 2012.
 31 May 2013: On 9:00 a.m., formal transmission of broadcast in channel 1 to 8, except 3, start from Tokyo Skytree after number of test transmission with off for minutes to hours from Tokyo Tower since 22 December 2012.

2022
 22 May 2022: the 10th anniversary of the opening of Tokyo Skytree was celebrated with Kabuki by Ichikawa Ebizo XI who performed a signature technique called the "nirami" glare on a special stage atop of the tower.

Opening
As the Skytree's opening approached, people reportedly waited in line for a week to get tickets. By the opening, trips up the tower were fully booked for the first two months of operation. The opening day drew a crowd of tens of thousands, despite rainy conditions which blocked the view from the tower's observation deck. Strong winds also forced two elevators to be shut down, leaving some visitors briefly stranded on the observation deck.

According to Tobu, 1.6 million people visited Skytree in its first week. Local residents reported that the influx of visitors disturbed the peace of their community and had, so far, generated little economic benefit for the local area.

Gallery

See also

 List of tallest buildings and structures in Japan
 List of tallest freestanding structures
 List of tallest towers
 List of transmission sites
 Sumida Aquarium
 Tokyo Skytree Station
 Sky City 1000
 Lattice tower
 CN tower

Notes

References

Sources
 Skyscrapernews article on New Tokyo Tower
 Profile on Phorio
 Project profile at Emporis

External links

  
 Tokyo Skytree live camera 

2012 establishments in Japan
Aquaria in Japan
Buildings and structures in Sumida, Tokyo
Communication towers in Japan
Lattice towers
Neo-futurism architecture
Observation towers in Japan
Radio masts and towers
Restaurant towers
Restaurants in Tokyo
Skyscrapers in Tokyo
Tobu Railway
Tourist attractions in Tokyo
Towers completed in 2012